St. Andre Assembly constituency is one of the 40 Goa Legislative Assembly constituencies of the state of Goa in southern India. St. Andre is also one of the 20 constituencies falling under the North Goa Lok Sabha constituency.

Members of Legislative Assembly

Election results

2022

2017

2012 result

References

External links
  

North Goa district
Assembly constituencies of Goa